CCXP (originally called Comic Con Experience) is a Brazilian multi-genre entertainment and comic convention. It is based on the San Diego Comic-Con and has attractions and contents about comics, TV series, movies, video games, literature and internet. It is the largest pop culture festival in the world.

History
The first edition was held in December 2014 in São Paulo, organized by the website Omelete, the comics agency Chiaroscuro Studios and toy company Piziitoys. It was visited by an estimated public of 100,000 and had 80 companies involved. Some of the invited artists included Jason Momoa, from Game of Thrones, and Sean Astin, from The Goonies and The Lord of the Rings film trilogy, in which he played the role of Samwise Gamgee.

History of each show

CCXP Awards 

During the 2021 edition of the event, the organizers announced the creation of the CCXP Awards, an award focused on pop culture. The format of the first edition of the awards was announced in March 2022, with a total of 32 awards, divided into six categories with several subcategories.

References

External links 

 
  (CCXP Cologne)

2014 establishments in Brazil
Annual events in Brazil
Conventions in Germany
Events in Cologne
Events in São Paulo
Festivals in Cologne
Festivals in São Paulo
Film festivals established in 2014
Film festivals in Brazil
Film festivals in Germany
Multigenre conventions
Pernambuco